Rabbit Island (also known as Traverse Island) is a  island in Lake Superior located  east of Michigan’s Keweenaw Peninsula. The island is largely uninhabited and protected by a conservation easement which prevents future development. The island is home to the Rabbit Island Residency, which sponsors a number of artists to live on the island during the summer months.

References

Islands of Lake Superior in Michigan